Volcanic Creek Cone is a small cinder cone  northeast of Atlin in northwestern British Columbia. The subdued form of Volcanic Creek cone is visible directly below the largest snow patch. The cone has probably suffered through at least one glacial episode. Volcanic Creek cone is part of the Northern Cordilleran Volcanic Province.

References
 Volcanic Creek, NW British Columbia, Canada

See also
 List of Northern Cordilleran volcanoes
 List of volcanoes in Canada
 Volcanism of Western Canada

Cinder cones of British Columbia
Atlin District
Holocene volcanoes
Monogenetic volcanoes
Northern Cordilleran Volcanic Province
One-thousanders of British Columbia